The 1863 Wisconsin gubernatorial election was held on November 3, 1863. Republican Party candidate James T. Lewis won the election with nearly 60% of the vote, defeating Democratic candidate Henry L. Palmer.

The incumbent Governor, Edward Salomon, had ascended to office after the accidental drowning of his predecessor, Louis P. Harvey, in April 1862.  He was a former Democrat who had been elected Lieutenant Governor on the Republican Party's Union ticket in 1861.  He was not re-nominated by the Republican Party.

Democratic Party
Henry L. Palmer was a former Speaker of the Wisconsin State Assembly, and had served three terms in the Assembly and one term in the Wisconsin State Senate prior to the 1863 election.

Republican (Union) Party
James T. Lewis was the incumbent Wisconsin Secretary of State at the time of the 1863 election, having been elected on the Union ticket in the 1861 election.  Lewis was also a former Democrat.  As a Democrat, he had previously served as Lieutenant Governor of Wisconsin from 1854 to 1856, and represented Columbia County in the state legislature for two years—in the Assembly for the 1852 session, and in the Senate for the 1853 session.

Results

| colspan="6" style="text-align:center;background-color: #e9e9e9;"| General Election, November 3, 1863

References

1863
1863 Wisconsin elections
Wisconsin